Irfan Vusljanin (born 7 January 1986) is a Serbian footballer, who currently plays for FK Sloboda Užice.

Career
He started playing with his home town club FK Novi Pazar. In summer 2005 he moved to play with top league club OFK Beograd where he will stay until 2008, mostly playing as a loaned player with other clubs. His only matches with OFK were in his first 2005-06 season there, but also one match in the last 2007-08 season. During this period he was loaned for half season with Spartak Subotica, another half season with his first club Novi Pazar, two half seasons with FK Borac Čačak and a half season with FK Sevojno. In summer 2008 he moved to a newly top promoted ambitious club FK Jagodina. In summer 2011 he moved back to FK Novi Pazar and played in Serbian Superliga.

Personal life
Vusljanin was born on 7 January 1986 in Novi Pazar, Sandžak, Serbia (then part of Yugoslavia). He is ethnic Bosniak.

References

External links
Profile at Srbijafudbal.net 
Stats at Utakmica.rs 

Association football midfielders
1986 births
Living people
Serbian footballers
Serbian expatriate footballers
Sportspeople from Novi Pazar
Bosniaks of Serbia
FK Novi Pazar players
OFK Beograd players
FK Spartak Subotica players
FK Borac Čačak players
FK Jagodina players
FK Sarajevo players
FK Radnički 1923 players
FK Belasica players
FK Radnički Pirot players
FK Sloboda Užice players
Serbian SuperLiga players
Serbian First League players
Premier League of Bosnia and Herzegovina players
Macedonian First Football League players
Serbian expatriate sportspeople in North Macedonia
Expatriate footballers in North Macedonia